Lydia Wilson (born 30 November 1984) is an English-American actress. Since graduating in 2009 from the Royal Academy of Dramatic Art, she has performed in numerous television and theatre productions including the Olivier Award winning Blasted by Sarah Kane in 2010 at the Lyric Theatre.

Early life
Wilson was born to an American mother and an English father and brought up in Queen's Park in London. She has said that her acting ambitions came from her grandparents, who were stage actors. After completing a foundation course at the Chelsea College of Art and Design, she studied English at Queens' College, Cambridge, then trained at the Royal Academy of Dramatic Art (RADA).

Career
Wilson made her film debut in the alternative history romance drama Never Let Me Go (2010). In 2014, she was included in the London Evening Standard list of the 1,000 most influential Londoners.

Theatre
 House of Special Purpose (2009) as Maria
 Pains of Youth (2009) as Desiree
 Blasted (2010) as Cate
 The Heretic (2011)
 The Acid Test (2011) as Jessica
 'Tis Pity She's a Whore (2011) as Annabella
 Hysteria (2013) as Jessica
 King Charles III (2014) as Kate, Duchess of Cambridge
 The Duchess of Malfi (2020) as The Duchess
 Walden (2021) as Cassie
 The 47th (2022) as Ivanka Trump

Filmography

Television

Radio
 A Tale of Two Cities (2011) as Lucie Manette
 The Exorcist (2014) as Regan MacNeil
Klara and the Sun (2021) as Narrator

References

External links
 
 
 

1984 births
Living people
Actresses from London
People from Kilburn, London
Alumni of RADA
Alumni of Queens' College, Cambridge
English film actresses
English people of American descent
English radio actresses
English stage actresses
English television actresses
21st-century English actresses